Tin-Hama  is a small town and commune in the Cercle of Ansongo in the Gao Region of south-eastern Mali. In 1998 the commune had a population of 1902.

References

External links
 Tin-Hama at csa-mali.org 

Communes of Gao Region